TCG Sultanhisar was a  built for the Turkish Navy during the Second World War. The design of her class was based on the British .

Description
Steam for the turbines was provided by three Admiralty three-drum boilers. The ship's complement was 145 officers and men.

The ship mounted four 45-calibre 4.7-inch (120 mm) Mark IX guns in single mounts. For anti-aircraft (AA) defence, Sultanhisar had four single mounts for Oerlikon 20 mm cannon. She was fitted with two above-water quadruple mounts for  torpedoes.

Construction and career
Sultanhisar was one of four I-class destroyers ordered by Turkey in 1939, two of which were purchased by the Royal Navy while construction of the other two proceeded slowly. The ship was laid down at William Denny and Brothers in Dumbarton, Scotland, on 21 March 1939. She was launched on 17 December 1940, and completed on 28 June 1941. The destroyer was transferred to Turkey in 1942, where she served until her decommissioning in 1960.

TCG Sultanhisar was the second ship of the Turkish Navy with the same name, following the Ottoman, and later Turkish,  torpedo boat .

Notes

References

External links
 

Ships built on the River Clyde
1940 ships
World War II destroyers of Turkey